Ibn Jibrīn or Abdullah ibn Abdulrahman ibn Jebreen (1933 – 13 July 2009) was a Saudi Arabian right wing politician. He was a member of the Council of Senior Scholars and Permanent Committee for Islamic Research and Issuing Fatwas in Saudi Arabia.

Career
Ibn Jebreen was born in 1933 in a village near the town of Al-Quway'iyah in the Nejd region in Saudi Arabia.

He received his secondary school certificate in 1958, a bachelor's degree in Shariah in 1961, master's degree in 1970 from the Higher Institute for the Judiciary, and a doctorate in 1987. "Several judges, teachers and religious callers were taught by him".

Views
He has been described as a member of the "hard-line conservative schools of Sunni Islam who have deemed Shiite as infidels. Commenting on Shias in 2007 (during height of Shia Sunni sectarian violence in Iraq), ibn Jebreen said: "Some people say that the rejectionists (Rafidha) are Muslims because they believe in God and his prophet, pray and fast. But I say they are heretics. They are the most vicious enemy of Muslims, who should be wary of their plots. They should be boycotted and expelled so that Muslims spared of their evil." He has been criticized by Abdul-Aziz al-Hakim, the political leader of Iraqi Shias. Ali al-Sistani, the religious leader of Iraqi Shias, has also criticized ibn Jebreen, accusing him of exacerbating tensions between Shiites and Sunnis in Iraq.

After the 2001 9/11 attacks Ibn Jebreen, issued a fatwa against hijackings. In regard to Muslims having contact with non-Muslims he states that "being a companion to them and showing love for them" may be forgiven if the goal of these acts is to convert them to Islam: "It is allowed to mix with the disbelievers, sit with them and be polite with them as means of calling them to Allah, explaining to them the teachings of Islam, encouraging them to enter this religion and to make it clear to them the good result of accepting the religion and the evil result of punishment for those who turn away. For this purpose, being a companion to them and showing love for them is overlooked in order to reach that good final goal."

References

1933 births
2009 deaths
Saudi Arabian Sunni Muslim scholars of Islam
Saudi Arabian Salafis
Imam Muhammad ibn Saud Islamic University alumni